Bill Joiner (29 August 1939 – 4 September 2017) was an Australian rules footballer who played with Hawthorn in the Victorian Football League (VFL).

Notes

External links 

2017 deaths
1939 births
Australian rules footballers from Victoria (Australia)
Hawthorn Football Club players